This is a list of awards and nominations received by Anglo-Irish stage and film actor Peter O'Toole.

O'Toole achieved international recognition playing T. E. Lawrence in Lawrence of Arabia (1962) for which he received his first nomination for the Academy Award for Best Actor. He was nominated for this award another seven times: for playing King Henry II in Becket (1964) and The Lion in Winter (1968), Goodbye, Mr. Chips (1969), The Ruling Class (1972), The Stunt Man (1980), My Favorite Year (1982), and Venus (2006) – and holds the record for the most Oscar nominations for acting without a win (tied with Glenn Close). In 2002, he was awarded the Academy Honorary Award for his career achievements.

O'Toole was the recipient of four Golden Globe Awards, one BAFTA Award for Best British Actor and one Primetime Emmy Award.

Major associations

Academy Awards

BAFTA Awards

Golden Globe Award

Grammy Award

Primetime Emmy Award

Screen Actors Guild Awards

Other awards and nominations

British Independent Film Awards

Critics' Choice Movie Awards

CableACE Awards

Chicago Film Critics Association

Dallas–Fort Worth Film Critics Association

David di Donatello

DVD Exclusive Awards

Golden Raspberry Awards

International Antalya Film Festival

Irish Film & Television Academy

Las Vegas Film Critics Society

Laurel Awards

London Film Critics' Circle

Los Angeles Film Critics Association

Monte-Carlo Television Festival

National Board of Review

National Society of Film Critics

New York Film Critics Circle

New Zealand Film and TV Award

Online Film Critics Society

Sant Jordi Awards

Satellite Awards

References

External links
 

OToole, Peter